The Bungle Bungle Range is a major landform and the main feature of the Purnululu National Park, situated in the Kimberley region of Western Australia.

Formation 
The distinctive beehive-shaped towers are made up of sandstones and conglomerates (rocks composed mainly of pebbles and boulders and cemented together by finer material). These sedimentary formations were deposited into the Red Basin 375 to 350 million years ago, when active faults altered the landscape. The combined effects of wind from the Tanami Desert and rainfall over millions of years shaped the domes.

Description
The range is found on the plains fringing the eastern Kimberley region. The ranges consist of stacks of ancient seabeds with layers of dolomite contained throughout them. 
A  diameter circular topographic feature is clearly visible on satellite images of the Bungle Bungle Range. It is believed that this feature is the eroded remnant of a very ancient meteorite impact crater and is known as the Piccaninny crater.

The unusual orange and dark grey banding on the conical rock formations is caused by differences in the layers of sandstone. The darker bands are on the layers of rock which hold more moisture, and are a dark algal or cyanobacteria growth. The orange coloured layers are stained with iron and manganese mineral deposits contained within the sandstone.

History
The traditional owners of the area are the Kija/Gija people.

Aboriginal people have been living in the area for over 20,000 years and continue to maintain a strong connection to this ancient landscape. The national park is managed by the Western Australian Department of Environment and Conservation in conjunction with the traditional Aboriginal owners.

The range remained largely unknown except by local Aboriginal people and stockmen until 1982 when film-makers arrived and produced a documentary about the Kimberley. The area was gazetted as a National Park in 1987 and was also inscribed as a UNESCO World Heritage Site in 2003.

See also 
 Protected areas of Western Australia
 List of reduplicated Australian place names

References

External links
Purnululu National Park
Bungle Bungle Range (Purnululu National Park) "Information Site" including all relevant history, Photos and information about the local area...Kununurra, Halls Creek and surrounds

Kimberley (Western Australia)
Rock formations of Western Australia